Bucha is a city in Ukraine's Kyiv Oblast. Administratively, it serves as the administrative center of Bucha Raion. It hosts the administration of Bucha urban hromada, one of the hromadas of Ukraine. Bucha Day is celebrated in the city between 11 and 13 September.

The Battle of Bucha was part of the Kyiv offensive in the 2022 Russian invasion of Ukraine. The battle lasted from 27 February 2022 to 31 March 2022 and ended with the withdrawal of Russian forces. Mayor Anatolii Fedoruk reported that Bucha had been fully retaken from Russian forces as of 31 March. After Ukrainian forces regained control of Bucha, reports and testimonies of war crimes committed by the Russian military began to circulate. These war crimes have been collectively labeled the Bucha massacre.

Etymology
According to a local historian from Bucha, Anatoliya Zborovsky, Bucha was named after a nearby river, the Bucha River, which referred to the strength of the river's currents in ancient times.

According to an urban legend, during the construction of the railway station, the workers were not paid so they started a huge scandal, or "bucha" ( – scandal). The railway station received this name after its completion, so did the village.

History
The settlement arose with the construction of the Kyiv–Kovel railway in 1898 around a small train stop by the  along the Kyiv–Kovel railway similar to one in the modern city of Irpin. In close vicinity to the Bucha train stop, there was a small village called Yablunka, where there used to be a brick factory. Yablunka is mentioned in the 19th century Polish Geographic dictionary as the village of Jabłonka 37 versts away from Kyiv.

During World War II, before the liberation of Kiev from Nazi forces in December 1943, Bucha was the location of the headquarters of the 1st Ukrainian Front commanded by General Vatutin.

Bucha was granted city status on February 9, 2006 (previously, Bucha was an urban-type settlement within the Irpin city municipality). Until 18 July 2020, Bucha was incorporated as a city of oblast significance. In July 2020, as part of the administrative reform of Ukraine, which reduced the number of raions of Kyiv Oblast to seven, the city of Bucha was merged into Bucha Raion.

2022 Russian invasion and massacre 

During the 2022 Russian invasion of Ukraine, heavy fighting took place in Bucha as part of the Kyiv offensive, resulting in severe Russian losses. The city was captured by Russian forces on 12 March. Mayor Anatoliy Fedoruk announced the recapture of Bucha by Ukrainian forces on 31 March 2022.

A few days after the recapture, on 2 April 2022, news reports and videos emerged showing streets in Bucha covered with the bodies of men dressed in civilian clothes. Some of those found had their hands tied. Among those killed were women and children. According to first estimations at least 280 bodies were found. There was also evidence that Russian soldiers had systemically tortured, mutilated and executed many Ukrainians in the basement of a summer camp. The event caused the Ukrainian government to call on the ICC to investigate whether or not Russia had committed war crimes. On April 7, the mayor of Bucha, Anatoliy Fedoruk, reported that almost 90% of the dead residents had bullet wounds, not shrapnel wounds.

Geography
Bucha is located in Kyiv Oblast, 25 km west of Kyiv. It borders the cities of Irpin and Hostomel and the villages of Vorzel, Mykhailivka-Rubezhivka, and Blystavytsia.

Places and people

There is a stadium in Bucha named Yuvileiny Stadium, where some matches were held in October 2016 for the 2017 UEFA European Under-19 Championship qualification.

There is a glass factory in Bucha. Built in 1946, it was closed in 2016. There is a small train stop called "Sklozavodska".

The town's main landmark is a 19th-century railway station located at the south edge of the city. Through the city runs a major highway .

Author Mikhail Bulgakov stayed in Bucha with his family during the summer season in his cottage.

Twin towns
Bucha is twinned with:

 Kovel, Ukraine
 Tiachiv, Ukraine
 Tuszyn, Poland
 Jasło, Poland
 Bucsa, Hungary
 Ferencváros, Hungary
 Bergamo, Italy
 Albany, New York, United States

Gallery

References

External links

bucha.com.ua - Unofficial city portal
Shvorak, I. History of the "Iron Volyn" (Історія "залізної Волині"). Volyn Times.
Ukraine: Apparent War Crimes in Russia-Controlled Areas  Summary Executions, Other Grave Abuses by Russian Forces. HRW, 3 April 2022

Bucha Raion
Cities in Kyiv Oblast
Cities of regional significance in Ukraine
Kyiv metropolitan area